Krist Gruijthuijsen (born 1980 in the Netherlands) is a curator and art critic, and since July 2016, Director of KW Institute for Contemporary Art in Berlin, Germany. At KW, he has curated exhibitions with, among others, Hanne Lippard, Ian Wilson, Adam Pendleton, Ronald Jones, Hiwa K, Willem de Rooij, Beatriz González, David Wojnarowicz, Hreinn Friðfinnsson, and Hassan Sharif.

Gruijthuijsen was Artistic Director of the Grazer Kunstverein in Graz (2012–2016) and Course Director of the MA Fine Arts Department at the Sandberg Instituut in Amsterdam (2011–2016). He is one of the co-founding directors of Kunstverein in Amsterdam and has organized numerous exhibitions and projects over the past decade, including Manifesta 7 (Trentino-South Tyrol, Italy), Platform Garanti Contemporary Art Center (Istanbul, Turkey), Artists Space(New York, USA), Museum of Contemporary Art (Belgrade, Serbia), Swiss Institute (New York, USA), Galeria Vermelho(São Paulo, Brazil), Stedelijk Museum (Amsterdam, the Netherlands), Van Abbemuseum (Eindhoven, the Netherlands), Arnolfini (Bristol, Great Britain), Project Arts Centre (Dublin, Ireland), Utah Museum of Contemporary Art (Salt Lake City, USA), and Institute of Modern Art (Brisbane, Australia).

Gruijthuijsen has produced, edited and published in numerous collaborations with JRP|Ringier Kunstverlag, Sternberg Press, Mousse Publishing Printed Matter, Inc., Verlag der Buchhandlung Walther König and Kunstverein Publishing. Recent publications are amongst others Mierle Laderman Ukeles – Seven Work Ballets (Sternberg Press, 2015), Vincent Fecteau (Sternberg Press, 2015), Writings and Conversations by Doug Ashford (Mousse Publishing, 2014), Lisa Oppenheim: Works 2003–2013 (Sternberg Press, 2014), The Encyclopedia of Fictional Artists and the Addition(JRP|Ringier, 2010), and several others under the umbrella of Kunstverein Publishing.

References 

1980 births
Living people
Dutch art curators
Dutch art critics